Spätzle are a type of Central European egg noodles typically served as a side for meat dishes with gravy. Commonly associated with Swabia, it is also found in the cuisines of southern Germany and Austria, Switzerland, Hungary, Vojvodina, Slovenia, Alsace, Moselle and South Tyrol.

Etymology
Spätzle is the Swabian diminutive of Spatz, thus literally "little sparrow". They are also known as Knöpfle (diminutive of button). In Switzerland they are called Spätzli or Chnöpfli, in Hungarian Nokedli, Csipetke or Galuska, in Slovak Halušky, in Slovenian Vaseršpacli or vodni žličniki and in Ladin Fierfuli.
 
Before the use of mechanical devices, the noodles were shaped by hand or with a spoon, and the results resembled Spatzen (plural of Spatz, meaning sparrows, sparrow is Spatz or Sperling in German; Spätzle is the diminutive of Spatz, unchanged in plural).

Knöpfle means "small buttons" and describes the compact, round form of the noodle. In everyday language usage, the two names refer to the same product made from the same dough and are interchangeable.  There is no clear distinction between how the two names are used, and usage varies from region to region.

History
The geographic origin of spätzle is not precisely known; various regions claim to be the originators of the noodles.  

The tradition of making "Spätzle" can be traced back to the 18th century, although medieval illustrations are believed to place the noodle at an even earlier date. In 1725, Rosino Lentilio, a councillor and personal physician from Württemberg, concluded that "Knöpflein" and "Spazen" were "all the things that are made from flour". Spelt was grown widely in the Swabian-Alemannic area at the time. The cereal grew on poor soils and was very popular in the region, which was home to small farmers and characterised by poverty. As spelt flour contains high levels of gluten protein, and the dough could therefore be made in times of hardship without the need for eggs, "Schwäbische Spätzle"/"Schwäbische Knöpfle" were mainly made from spelt. The product achieved fame in the Münsinger Alb upland area. As industrialisation began and prosperity increased, the noodles went from an ordinary, everyday food item to a culinary specialty eaten on feast days. In a description of a Swabian farmers’ village written in 1937, "spätzle" are described as a festive food.
The great importance of "Schwäbische Spätzle"/"Schwäbische Knöpfle" in Swabian cooking can be seen, inter alia, from the 1827 novel Die Geschichte von den Sieben Schwaben, according to which the custom in Swabia is "to eat five times a day, five times soup, twice with Knöpfle or Spätzle".

Today, Spätzle are largely considered a "Swabian speciality" and are generally associated with the German state of Baden-Württemberg. In France, they are associated with Alsace and Moselle. Germany's estimated annual commercial production of spätzle is approximately 40,000 tons. Pre-made spätzle are also available internationally.

Protected designation of origin
Since March 2012, Swabian Spätzle and Swabian Knöpfle have been awarded the EU quality seal for "Protected Geographical Indications (PGI)" and are protected throughout Europe as a regional specialty. To be able to bear this sign, one of the production stages of the product must have taken place in the respectively defined region of origin.

Preparation

Spätzle is a type of pasta or dumpling or noodles.
Spätzle dough typically consists of few ingredients, principally eggs, flour, and salt. The Swabian rule of thumb is to use a number of eggs equal to the number of servings, plus one. Water is often added to produce a runnier dough. The flour traditionally used for spätzle is bread wheat (not the durum wheat used for Italian pasta); however, a more coarsely milled type is used for spätzle making than for baking. This flour type is known as Dunst, similar to US "first clear" or Czech hrubá type. This gives a chewier texture but can produce a dough too crumbly for scraping if no water is added, particularly when cutting short on eggs for dietary reasons. If fine ("all-purpose") flour and the full amount of eggs are used, all fat and moisture in the dough is derived from these, and water is rarely necessary.

Traditionally, spätzle are made by scraping long, thin strips of dough off a wooden (sometimes wet) chopping board (spätzlebrett) into boiling salted water, where they cook until they rise to the surface. Altogether, the dough should thus be as viscous as to slowly flow apart if cut into strips with a knife, yet hold the initial shape for some seconds. If dropped into boiling water, the albumen will congeal quickly in the boiling water, while the yolk will keep the dough succulent. After the pasta has become firm, they are skimmed and put aside.

Since this can be a cumbersome way to prepare spätzle, several devices were invented to facilitate cooking that resemble a strainer or colander, potato ricer (spätzlepresse), food mill or coarse grater (spätzlehobel). As with scraped spätzle, the dough drops into the boiling water. Those instruments that use muscle pressure in addition to gravity can be used with a firmer dough; that for a spätzlehobel should be as "runny" as the one for scraping.

Dough varieties
For certain specialty dishes, the dough may be enriched with minced pork liver (resulting in ), spinach, or finely grated cheese.

Dishes

In Hungary, spätzle often are used in soup. Spätzle also are used as a primary ingredient in dishes including:

Savory
Linsen, Spätzle und Saitenwürstle: Spätzle with lentils and fine-skinned, frankfurter-style sausages
Käsespätzle: Spätzle mixed with grated cheese (typically Emmenthaler) and fried onion
Gaisburger Marsch: Traditional Swabian beef stew with potatoes and carrots
Krautspätzle: Spätzle mixed with sauerkraut, onion, butter and spices such as marjoram and/or caraway
 Spätzle mit Käse überbacken – Spätzle mixed with cheese and topped with paprika
Leberspätzle: Spätzle mixed with ground liver often served as a soup with a clear broth
Spinatspatzeln (Tyrolean dialect): Spätzle which also contains spinach as one of the ingredients; a speciality of Trentino-Alto Adige/Südtirol

Sweet
Kirschspätzle: Spätzle mixed with fresh cherries, dressed with clarified, browned butter, sugar, and cinnamon and/or nutmeg. In the Allgäu, this is served as a one-dish supper in late summer.
Apfelspätzle: Spätzle with grated apples in the dough, dressed with clarified, browned butter, sugar, and cinnamon. In the Allgäu, this is served as a one-dish supper in autumn.

Gallery

See also
 Gnocchi, similar Italian pasta/dumplings
 Halušky, eastern European equivalent of spätzle
 Klöße, larger dumplings
 Knoephla
 Passatelli, similar Italian pasta made with bread crumbs in place of flour
 Schupfnudel
 Swabian Spätzle

References

External links
 How to Make Spätzle
 Article about Spätzle

Alsatian cuisine
Austrian cuisine
German cuisine
Hungarian cuisine
Swiss cuisine
Swabian cuisine

hu:Nokedli